Now or Never is a Canadian radio documentary series broadcast on CBC Radio One.

Hosted by Ify Chiwetelu and Trevor Dineen, the show features profiles of people making things happen, whether it be unusual businesses, community projects or other endeavours.

References

External links
 Now or Never

CBC Radio One programs
Canadian talk radio programs
Canadian documentary radio programs
2017 radio programme debuts